Aashiqui is a 2022 Bhojpuri-Language action romance film directed by Parag Patil produced by produced by Pradeep K. Sharma under Baba Motion Pictures. Written by Khesari Lal Yadav the film talks about social topics like Untouchability and Inter-caste marriage. It film stars Khesari Lal Yadav, Kunal Singh, Amrapali Dubey and Shruti Rao.

Plot 
Raja, a Brahmin boy falls in love with Ganga, a girl from lower caste, denies to marry to the girl of his father's choice for Ganga and leaves his caste.

Cast 

 Khesari Lal Yadav as Raja Dubey, an upper caste boy
 Kunal Singh as Satish Dubey, Raja's father
 Amrapali Dubey as Ganga, a lower caste girl and Raja's love
 Shruti Rao
 Pappu Yadav, a man from Ganga's community

Production

Development
Story of this film was written by Khesari Lal Yadav during Covid-19 lockdown.

Casting
Amrapali Dubey was chosen for the role against Khesari Lal Yadav. Later the name of Shruti Rao also announced.

Filming

The Principal photography commenced on 5 March 2021 in Allahabad.

Marketing
The first look of the film released on 21 October 2021. The trailer of the film released on 24 October 2021 on YouTube.

Music
Soundtrack of the film is produced by Om Jha and Arya Sharma while Shyam Dehati and Vijay Chauhan wrote the lyrics.

Release
The film released on 4 March 2020 across India.

Reception

Reference

External links 
 

2022 films
2022 romantic drama films
Indian romantic drama films